Bols may refer to:
 Bol (music), an element of Indian rhythm
 Lucas Bols, a Dutch distilling company
 Bols (brand), a beverage brand name used by Lucas Bols
 Bols (surname), a Dutch surname
 Bell of Lost Souls Interactive, American online publisher and marketing service company

See also 
 Bol (disambiguation)
 Bowles (disambiguation)